The spot-throated babbler (Pellorneum albiventre) is a species of bird in the family Pellorneidae. It is found mainly in Eastern Bangladesh, Bhutan, Northeast India, Yunnan, Myanmar and Vietnam.

Its natural habitats are subtropical or tropical moist lowland forest and subtropical or tropical moist montane forest.

References

Collar, N. J. & Robson, C. 2007. Family Timaliidae (Babblers)  pp. 70 – 291 in; del Hoyo, J., Elliott, A. & Christie, D.A. eds. Handbook of the Birds of the World, Vol. 12. Picathartes to Tits and Chickadees. Lynx Edicions, Barcelona.

spot-throated babbler
Birds of Bhutan
Birds of Northeast India
Birds of Myanmar
Birds of Vietnam
Birds of Yunnan
spot-throated babbler
Taxonomy articles created by Polbot